Ganswindt is a lunar impact crater that lies near the southern pole of the Moon's far side. It is attached to the southwestern exterior of the huge walled plain Schrödinger. Ganswindt partly overlies the smaller crater Idel'son to the south.

The rim of Gandswindt is roughly circular but somewhat irregular, particularly at the southern edge. Much of the interior floor is covered in uneven ridges, and there is a small crater in the southeastern section. Because sunlight enters the interior at a low angle, the northern part of the floor is almost always covered in shadow, concealing the terrain in that section of the crater.

The crater was named in honor of Hermann Ganswindt (1856-1934), the aviation pioneer who first proposed reaction vehicles for space travel in 1881. He also proposed time as a fourth dimension.

References 

 
 
 
 
 
 
 
 
 
 
 
 

Impact craters on the Moon